Kate Anderson may refer to:

 Kate Anderson (cricketer) (born 1996), New Zealand cricketer
 Kate Anderson-Richardson (born 1973), née Kate Anderson
 Kate Anderson, fictional character in Intelligence (U.S. TV series)

See also
Katie Anderson (disambiguation)
Katherine Anderson (disambiguation)